The 2016–17 season was Unione Sportiva Città di Palermo's third consecutive season in the top-flight of Italian football. Palermo competed in Serie A and the Coppa Italia. Palermo finished the league season in 19th place and were relegated to Serie B.

Squad information 
Players and squad numbers last updated on 31 January 2017.Appearances and goals are counted for domestic leagues (Serie A and Serie B) and national cup (Coppa Italia) and correct as of 28 May 2017.Note: Flags indicate national team as has been defined under FIFA eligibility rules. Players may hold more than one non-FIFA nationality.

Transfers

In

Loans in

Out

Loans out

Pre-season and friendlies

Competitions

Overall

Last updated: 28 May 2017

Serie A

League table

Results summary

Results by round

Matches

Coppa Italia

Statistics

Appearances and goals

|-
! colspan=14 style="background:#EEBBBB; text-align:center| Goalkeepers

|-
! colspan=14 style="background:#EEBBBB; text-align:center| Defenders

|-
! colspan=14 style="background:#EEBBBB; text-align:center| Midfielders

|-
! colspan=14 style="background:#EEBBBB; text-align:center| Forwards

|-
! colspan=14 style="background:#EEBBBB; text-align:center| Players transferred out during the season

Goalscorers

Last updated: 28 May 2017

Clean sheets

Last updated: 28 May 2017

Disciplinary record

Last updated: 28 May 2017

References

Palermo F.C. seasons
Palermo